Rings on Their Fingers is a British television sitcom, written by Richard Waring. It ran from October 1978 to November 1980.

Plot
It concerns a young unmarried couple (Sandy Bennett and Oliver Pryde) played by Diane Keen and Martin Jarvis. Sandy wishes to marry whereas Oliver is happy to remain unmarried. During the first series they do marry and in the second series they adjust to married life. A proposed fourth series would have concerned Sandy becoming pregnant unexpectedly, and Sandy and Oliver adapting to parenthood, but the series was not re-commissioned.

Cast

Episode list

DVD releases

References

External links

BBC television sitcoms
1978 British television series debuts
1980 British television series endings
1970s British sitcoms
1980s British sitcoms
English-language television shows